Francesc Badia Batalla (10 January 1923 – 14 August 2020) was an Andorran public servant and historian. He served as the Episcopal Veguer of Andorra from 1972 until 1993. He also served as a judge of the Tribunal of the Courts of Andorra over the same time frame.

References

1923 births
2020 deaths
Andorran lawyers
Andorran politicians
Andorran judges